The Mississippi Athletic Conference (MAC Conference, or MAC) is a high school athletic conference whose members are located in the Iowa Quad-Cities, plus three other schools in eastern Iowa.

Member schools
There are ten full members of the Mississippi Athletic Conference. Eight of those schools are in Class 4A for boys' and girls' sports and Class 4A, Iowa's largest enrollment classes. The smallest — Davenport Assumption — is in Class 3A (the second largest among Iowa's four enrollment classes) and has switched between Class 3A and 4A for girls' sports; however, Assumption does play with the Class 4A schools in boys' golf. For say, Muscatine is a 4A school. 

Newest member Central DeWitt competes in Class 3A for boys' sports and Class 4A for girls' sports, and will play Class 4A boys' golf.

Sports
The conference offers the following sports:

 Fall — Football, volleyball, boys' cross-country, girls' cross-country, boys' golf and girls' swimming.
 Winter — Boys' basketball, girls' basketball, wrestling and boys' swimming. Bowling was added in 2006-2007.
 Spring — Boys' track and field, girls' track and field, boys' soccer, girls' soccer, boys' tennis, girls' tennis and girls' golf.
 Summer — Baseball and softball.

Although the member schools field freshman — and in some cases, junior varsity — teams in many of the above-mentioned sports, conference championships are determined at sophomore and varsity levels only. Also, not all schools field teams in every sport (e.g., North Scott does not have its own swimming teams).

History
The MAC — as it is known to locals — was formed in 1978. Charter members Bettendorf, Clinton and Muscatine had been members of the Mississippi Valley Conference, while Davenport schools Assumption, Central and West were part of the Quad-City Metro Conference. North Scott, which was participating in its first "big school" conference, had been in the Big Bend Conference (along with several smaller schools), and Burlington was not affiliated with any conference. At the time, the conference was known as the "Mississippi Eight."

Davenport North opened its doors in 1985 and was immediately admitted to the newly renamed MAC. Pleasant Valley became a part-time member in 1985, although it didn't compete in football, basketball, wrestling, baseball or softball until 1987 when the school became a full-fledged member.

The MAC's membership remained stable for more than three decades, until Burlington announced plans to leave the conference and join the Southeast Conference, a league of five schools whose locations were much closer to Burlington than conference schools in the MAC. In April 2018, a vote of league representatives approved Burlington's request to leave following the 2018-2019 school year and join the Southeast Conference, leaving the MAC with nine schools.

In April 2019, principals from the remaining nine MAC schools voted to admit Central DeWitt, bringing the league back to 10 schools. Upon them joining the league in the fall of 2020, Central DeWitt would be the smallest public school in the conference—firmly Class 3A in a league of otherwise primarily Class 4A schools—with only Davenport Assumption having a smaller enrollment.

† Left conference in 2019.

End of MAC conference for football
2013 was the last year that the ten schools played each other for football. The teams were switched to district play in the fall of 2014 with Pleasant Valley being the last MAC football champions.

Rivalries with Illinois Western Big 6
In December, seven MAC teams — Davenport North, Davenport West, Davenport Central, Davenport Assumption, North Scott, Bettendorf and Pleasant Valley — compete in the annual Genesis PSP Shootout, a competition matching the Iowa schools against teams from the Illinois Quad-Cities. The Illinois teams are Moline, United Township (of East Moline), Rock Island, Rock Island Alleman, Geneseo and Galesburg, all representing the Western Big 6 Conference; the other participating team is Riverdale of Port Byron, Illinois. No champion is crowned, although matchups are generally determined based on pre-season polls and past successes of the competing teams, with the two teams believed to be the "best" in the pre-season polls playing in the last game of the day.

A similar seven-game shootout competition for the girls takes place in January at Wharton Field House in Moline; the same six MAC schools compete against the metro Western Big Six schools, plus Geneseo and other schools from western Illinois. MVPs are named for each game. Starting with the 2017-2018 season, a dual team wrestling tournament between metro MAC and Western Big Six schools was started, with the state winner determined by the average dual meet score from schools from a given state.

In March, after the conclusion of the state basketball tournaments in Iowa and Illinois, an all-star game consisting of the area's top senior players is played at Augustana College, with seniors from primarily the MAC matched against their counterparts from the Western Big Six. Boys and girls games are played, with an MVP named for each game. Similar Iowa-vs.-Illinois all-star contests are contested for volleyball, boys' and girls' soccer, baseball and softball.

External links

References

Sports in the Quad Cities
High school sports in Iowa
1978 establishments in Iowa
Sports leagues established in 1978